Holmenkollen may refer to

 Holmenkollen, a neighborhood in Oslo
 Holmenkollen National Arena, a skiing and ski jumping venue
 Holmenkollbakken, the ski jump
 Holmenkollen Ski Festival
 Holmenkollen Medal
 Holmenkollen Line of the Oslo Metro
 Holmenkollen (station)
 Holmenkollen Chapel
 Holmenkollen Park Hotel Rica
 The Royal Lodge, Holmenkollen